James or Jim Harvey may refer to:

Politics
James G. Harvey (1869–1950), politician in Manitoba, Canada
James M. Harvey (politician) (1833–1894), US senator from Kansas and Governor of Kansas
R. James Harvey (1922–2019),  politician and jurist from the U.S. state of Michigan
Sir James Harvey (merchant) (died 1583), Lord Mayor of London in 1581
James Harvey (Australian politician) (died 1912), New South Wales politician

Sports
James Harvey (basketball) (born 1979), Australian basketball player
Jamie Harvey (born 1955), Scottish darts player
Jim Harvey (born 1958), Northern Irish footballer
James Harvey (footballer) (1911–?), English football goalkeeper
Jim Harvey (American football) (born 1943), American football player

Others
James Michael Harvey (born 1949), Roman Catholic cardinal, former Prefect of the Papal Household
James Harvey (artist) (1929–1965), American commercial and fine artist
James B. Harvey, served as the International Commissioner of Scouts Canada
James H. Harvey, member of the Tuskegee Airmen
Jim Harvey (firearms), American designer of firearms
James Harvey, African-American man lynched on July 1, 1922, see Lynching of James Harvey and Joe Jordan

See also